The 2016 H1 Unlimited season is the sixty-first running of the H1 Unlimited series for unlimited hydroplanes, sanctioned by the APBA.

Teams and drivers 
In 2016, all boats used Lycoming Engines with the exception of the U-3 Go3Racing team which used an Allison V-12 engine and the U-18 Bucket List Racing team that used a smaller T-53 Lycoming turbine engine.

2016 Season Summary
The 2016 season began with the 66th annual Madison Regatta held in Madison, IN on July 1-3. Jimmy Shane, piloting the hometown U-1 HomeStreet Bank Miss Madison boat, finished first. J. Michael Kelly, in the U-5 Graham Trucking craft, officially placed second, followed by Brian Perkins, piloting the U-21 PayneWest Insurance.

The next race was the HAPO Columbia Cup held at Tri-Cities, WA on July 29-31. J. Michael Kelly, driving the U-5 Graham Trucking, was named the winner of the 2016 HAPO Columbia Cup. Jimmy Shane drove the U-1 Miss HomeStreet Bank to an apparent victory; however, after the race, H1 officials reviewed video and reversed an initial call, saying Shane slid out from Lane 1 and hit Jean Theoret in the U-16 Oh Boy! Oberto. Theoret finished second behind Kelly, while Jimmy King in the U-3 Griggs presents the Miss Ace Hardware was third. The U-1 Miss HomeStreet Bank team filed an appeal with the APBA, and on December 7, 2016, the team received notification from APBA National Commissioner, Charles D. Strang, that their August appeal and request for a review of the final heat and race results of the 2016 HAPO Columbia Cup was completed and that the HomeStreet Bank Unlimited Hydroplane had been declared the winner of the race.

The third race of the season was the Albert Lee Cup at Seafair held at Seattle, WA on August 5-7. Andrew Tate in the  U-9 Sound Propeller presents Les Schwab Tires boa grabbed the inside lane on the Lake Washington course and grabbed the first win by a rookie at Seafair since 1956. Jimmy Shane in the U-1 HomeStreet Bank finished second. Third place was awarded to Brian Perkins at the wheel of U-21 Albert Lee Appliance, after J. Michael Kelly was hit with a one-lap penalty for a lane violation.

The fourth race of the season was the ABPA Gold Cup hosted by the UAW-GM Hydrofest at Detroit, MI on August 26-28. J. Michael Kelly in the U-5 Graham Trucking won the 100th anniversary Gold Cup to beat two-time defending champion Jimmy Shane in the U-1 HomeStreet Bank by 30 lengths. Jeff Bernard in the U-7 took third.

The final race of the season was the San Diego Bayfair on September 15-17. Jimmy Shane drove U-1 Miss HomeStreet Bank to a convincing victory at the HomeStreet Bayfair Regatta for the Bill Muncey Cup on Mission Bay. In addition, the Miss HomeStreet Bank team captured its third consecutive national championship, and Shane earned his fourth consecutive driving championship. Second place went to Andrew Tate driving U-9 Delta Realtrac, and J. Michael Kelly finished third with U-5 Graham Trucking.

Season Schedule and Results

National High Points Standings 

Note: Points earned by the U-3 in Tri-Cities and Seattle were credited to U-27.

References 

H1 Unlimited
H1 Unlimited seasons
Hydro
Hydro